Emperor Xiaohuai may refer to:

Liu Shan (207–271), emperor of Shu Han
Emperor Huai of Jin (284–313)